The Kurdistani Coalition or Kurdistan Alliance Party is an electoral coalition founded by the major Kurdish parties of Kurdistan Region to run in the next Iraqi governorate elections. The coalition will run in the disputed areas between Iraq and Kurdistan Region and Baghdad Governorate to consolidate Kurdish votes. A total of 96 candidates will run as part of the coalition.

Composition
The original parties are the Kurdistan Democratic Party, Kurdistan Islamic Union, Kurdistan Islamic Movement, Movement for Change, Kurdistan Islamic Group, Communist Party of Kurdistan, Kurdistan Toilers' Party and Kurdistan Socialist Democratic Party. New Generation Movement has also been invited to join the coalition who subsequently stated their support for the alliance. On 30 September, leader of the Yazidi Democratic Party Haydar Shesho announced the party's intention to run as part of the coalition in 2020.

On 29 September 2019, the pro-Kurdistan Workers' Party Kurdistan Society Freedom Movement (Tevgera Azadi) initially boycotted the coalition arguing they were not informed about the negotiations. However, on 6 October 2019, the party changed its position and expressed support for the coalition.

As of 6 October 2019, 23 parties have joined the coalition, while the number rose to 30 in late October and include Arab and Turkmen parties. The named parties are:

Previous results
Previous results of Kurdish coalition lists:

References

Kurdish nationalism
Kurdish political party alliances
Political parties established in 2019
Political parties in Kurdistan Region